Nassarius crassiusculus, is a species of sea snail, a marine gastropod mollusc in the family Nassariidae, the Nassa mud snails or dog whelks.

Taxonomy
Buccinum / Nassarius elegans was regarded by Cernohorsky (1984) as a synonym of Nassarius comptus. It is listed in WoRMS as a valid species on the authority of H. Kool.  However, as the name Buccinum elegans Kiener, 1834, is nomenclaturally invalid, it is listed under its replacement name, Buccinum / Nassarius crassiusculus.

Description
The thick shell is ovate, conical, shining and smooth. Its ground color is whitish, ornamented with numerous undulated and reddish longitudinal lines. The spire composed of eight or nine convex whorls. The upper ones are plaited, and the others marked at their upper part with white and brown spots or blotches, alternately disposed, and surrounding the suture. A band a little deeper colored covers the body of the body whorl, the base of which is furnished with pretty distinct transverse striae or furrows, five or six in number. The white aperture is ovate, terminated above by a sort of canal, indicated by a transverse ridge upon the left lip. The outer lip is thick, slightly denticulated towards the base, and deeply striated within. The columella is arcuated, the base spirally folded. The left lip covers it, extends slightly upon the body of the shell, and forms a small, projecting keel, terminated by small drops, and a raised point.

Distribution
This species occurs in the Indian Ocean off the Seychelles

References

 Jarrett, A.G. (2000) Marine Shells of the Seychelles. Carole Green Publishing, Cambridge, xiv + 149 pp. NIZT 682 page(s): 69, fig. 300
 Manganelli G., Spadini V. & Martini I. (2010). Rediscovery of an enigmatic Euro-Mediterranean Pliocene nassariid species: Nassarius crassiusculus Bellardi, 1882 (Gastropoda: Nassariidae). Bollettino della Società Paleontologica Italiana, 49 (3): 195–202

External links

Nassariidae
Gastropods described in 1845
Molluscs of the Indian Ocean